John Michael Lutz (born April 23, 1973) is an American actor, comedian, and screenwriter. He is best known for playing J. D. Lutz on the NBC sitcom 30 Rock, and for his work as a writer on the NBC series Saturday Night Live for seven seasons. In 2014, he joined the writing staff of the NBC late-night talk show Late Night with Seth Meyers.

Early life
Lutz was born in Pipestone, Minnesota, the son of a Lutheran minister. He grew up in suburban Chicago, Illinois and Detroit, Michigan. He has two brothers: Jeremy, a math teacher in North Carolina, and Joel; and a sister, Jaime. He attended Valparaiso University in Valparaiso, Indiana, where he was a member of the Sigma Phi Epsilon fraternity, majoring in psychology and minoring in business. He performed in university theatre productions during his last three semesters on campus.

Career
Lutz began his professional career as a writer-performer with Chicago's ImprovOlympic and The Second City theaters. He was hired at NBC's Saturday Night Live in February 2004 after spending three years touring with Second City. NBC flew him in first-class to New York for a face-to-face interview with Lorne Michaels, the creator and executive producer of the sketch comedy show.

During this time, he has also appeared in small roles on SNL. Lutz played the role of J. D. Lutz on the NBC sitcom 30 Rock until the series completion in January 2013. His character was a part-Inuit sketch comedy writer from Alaska, who is bisexual and was often targeted by his co-workers for his meek demeanor.

Lutz made frequent appearances in the long-running hit improv show ASSSSCAT 3000 at the Upright Citizens Brigade Theater in New York City.

Starting in November 2010, Lutz has been performing at the Upright Citizens Brigade Theatre in New York with fellow 30 Rock star Scott Adsit in the two-man improv show John and Scott. He and Scott perform long-form improv with a single suggestion from an audience member. The show has been very successful and is still running as of April, 2019.

On October 17, 2011, he appeared in an episode of The Good Wife.

Lutz wrote a radio play entitled Escape from Virtual Island released on Audible in April 2020. The voice cast includes Paul Rudd, Jack McBrayer, Paula Pell and Jane Krakowski.

In 2020, Lutz starred, co-wrote, and executive produced Mapleworth Murders a comedy-mystery series for Quibi opposite Paula Pell.

Personal life
Lutz is married to Saturday Night Live contributor and 30 Rock co-star Sue Galloway, with whom he has two children.

Filmography

Acting

Writing

References

External links
 

1973 births
Living people
American male comedians
American male television actors
American people of German descent
American television writers
American male television writers
Male actors from Minnesota
People from Pipestone, Minnesota
Valparaiso University alumni
21st-century American male actors
Male actors from Chicago
Male actors from Detroit
Writers from Chicago
Writers from Detroit
Comedians from Illinois
Screenwriters from Illinois
Screenwriters from Michigan
Screenwriters from Minnesota
21st-century American comedians
Late Night with Seth Meyers
21st-century American screenwriters
21st-century American male writers